Aleksandr Degtyarev (born 26 March 1955) is a Soviet sprint canoeist who competed in the 1970s. He won a gold medal in the K-4 1000 m event at the 1976 Summer Olympics in Montreal.

Degtyarev also won a silver in the K-4 1000 m event at the 1974 ICF Canoe Sprint World Championships in Mexico City.

References

1955 births
Canoeists at the 1976 Summer Olympics
Living people
Olympic canoeists of the Soviet Union
Olympic gold medalists for the Soviet Union
Soviet male canoeists
Olympic medalists in canoeing
Russian male canoeists
ICF Canoe Sprint World Championships medalists in kayak
Medalists at the 1976 Summer Olympics